Virginia Berridge,  (born 1946) is a British academic historian and public health expert.

Berridge has a first degree and a PhD in history, both from the University of London, and is a Professor of History and Director of the Centre for History in Public Health at the London School of Hygiene and Tropical Medicine.

She worked in the Addiction Research Unit of the Institute of Psychiatry from 1974 to 1979 and at the Economic and Social Research Council from 1986–1987. From 1979 to 88 she was at the Institute of Historical Research, University of London.

Selected works
 Opium and the People: Opiate Use in Nineteenth-Century England (1987)
 AIDS in the UK: The Making of Policy, 1981–1994 (1996)
 Marketing health: Smoking and the discourse of public health, 1945–2000 (2007)
 Demons: Our Changing Attitudes to Alcohol, Tobacco, and Drugs (2014) 
 Public Health: A Very Short Introduction (2016)
 The Internationalisation of Tobacco Control, 1950-2010 (2016)
 Infiltrating history into the public health curriculum (2018)

References

External links 
 
 
 

1946 births
British women historians
Fellows of the Royal Historical Society
Honorary Fellows of the Faculty of Public Health
Honorary Fellows of the Royal College of Physicians
Fellows of the Academy of Social Sciences
Living people
20th-century British historians
20th-century British women writers
21st-century British historians
21st-century British women writers